Max Collins may refer to:

 Max Collins (musician) (born 1978), American musician
 Max Allan Collins (born 1948), American mystery writer
 Max Collins (actress) (born 1992), Filipino American actress and model
 Max Collins (Vanished character)